Madeleine Lemaire, née Coll (1845 – 8 April 1928), was a French painter who specialized in elegant genre works and flowers. Robert de Montesquiou said she was The Empress of the Roses. She introduced Marcel Proust and Reynaldo Hahn to the Parisian salons of the aristocracy. She herself held a salon where she received high society in her hôtel particulier on the Rue de Monceau.

Lemaire exhibited her work at the Palace of Fine Arts and The Woman's Building at the 1893 World's Columbian Exposition in Chicago, Illinois.

George Painter stated in his book Marcel Proust she is one of the models of Proust's Madame Verdurin (In Search of Lost Time).

Links 
 The Salon of Mme Madeleine Lemaire
Madeleine Jeanne Lemaire – Artworks on The Athenaeum

References

Gallery

19th-century French painters
20th-century French painters
French women painters
1845 births
1928 deaths
20th-century French women artists
19th-century French women artists